The Head is a 1959 West German horror film directed by Victor Trivas.

Cast 
 Horst Frank - Dr. Brandt - alias Dr. Ood
 Michel Simon - Prof. Dr. Abel
  - Schwester Irene Sander
 Helmut Schmid - Bert Jaeger
 Paul Dahlke - Police Commissioner Sturm
 Dieter Eppler - Paul Lerner
  - Dr. Walter Burke
 Christiane Maybach - Lilly

Release
The Head was distributed theatrically in Europe on July 24, 1959.  It was released in 1961 in the United States.

References

External links 

 

1959 horror films
1959 films
1950s science fiction horror films
German science fiction horror films
West German films
UFA GmbH films
1950s German-language films
1950s German films